Ultimate Fight Night 5 was a mixed martial arts event held by the Ultimate Fighting Championship on June 28, 2006.  The event took place at Hard Rock Hotel and Casino, in Las Vegas, Nevada and was broadcast live on Spike TV in the United States and Canada.  

The show drew a 1.4 overall rating and served as the lead-in for the premiere of Blade: The Series. This event featured the UFC debut of future middleweight champion Anderson Silva and also featured the first of 2 fights between future welterweight stars Jon Fitch and Thiago Alves . The disclosed fighter payroll for the event was $197,000.


Results

Bonus awards
Fight of the Night: Jonathan Goulet vs. Luke Cummo
Knockout of the Night: Anderson Silva
Submission of the Night: Rob MacDonald

Reported Payout

Anderson Silva: $36,000

Rashad Evans: $24,000

Stephan Bonnar: $16,000

Jon Fitch: $16,000

Josh Koscheck: $14,000

Jason Lambert: $14,000

Luke Cummo: $12,000

Rob MacDonald: $10,000

Mark Hominick: $8,000

Chris Leben: $7,000

Thiago Alves: $6,000

Jonathan Goulet: $6,000

Kristian Rothaermel: $5,000

Jorge Gurgel: $5,000

Justin Levens: $5,000

Dave Menne: $5,000

Branden Lee Hinkle: $4,000

Jorge Santiago: $4,000

Disclosed Fighter Payroll: $197,000

See also
 Ultimate Fighting Championship
 List of UFC champions
 List of UFC events
 2006 in UFC

References

UFC Fight Night
2006 in mixed martial arts
Mixed martial arts in Las Vegas
2006 in sports in Nevada
Hard Rock Hotel and Casino (Las Vegas)